Fusion Magazine may refer to:

 Fusion, a music magazine published in Boston, Massachusetts, from 1967 to 1974
 Fusion Magazine (Kent State University)
 Fusion Magazine (political magazine), founded and edited by Glenn Beck and published in the United States
 Fusion Magazine, a scientific magazine published by the LaRouche movement, shut down by the U.S. government in 1987 and later succeeded by 21st Century Science and Technology
 Fusion, an online arts magazine published by Berklee College of Music
 Fusion, the quarterly staff magazine of Associated-Rediffusion and later Rediffusion, London from 1958 until 1967